Agara is a village development committee in Makwanpur District in the Narayani Zone of southern Nepal. At the time of the 1991 Nepal census it had a population of 6839 people living in 1252 individual households.

References

Populated places in Makwanpur District